Haruni (also Romanized as Hārūnī; also known as Hānūn) is a city in Laran District of Shahrekord County, Chaharmahal and Bakhtiari province, Iran. At the 2006 census, its population was 4,317 in 881 households, when it was a village. The following census in 2011 counted 4,218 people in 1,044 households. The latest census in 2016 showed a population of 3,601 people in 966 households, by which time Haruni was elevated to the status of a city. The city is populated by Persians.

References 

Shahrekord County

Cities in Chaharmahal and Bakhtiari Province

Populated places in Chaharmahal and Bakhtiari Province

Populated places in Shahr-e Kord County